The Diocese of Ottawa is a diocese of the Ecclesiastical Province of Ontario of the Anglican Church of Canada, itself a province of the Anglican Communion, in Ottawa, Ontario, Canada. The diocese was established on April 7, 1896.

In June 2016, the diocese announced that it would allow same-sex marriage.

Bishops of Ottawa

References

External links
 Anglican Diocese of Ottawa site

1896 establishments in Ontario
Ottawa, Anglican Diocese of
Organizations based in Ottawa
Anglican Province of Ontario